Black Dyke Band, formerly John Foster & Son Black Dyke Mills Band, is one of the oldest and best-known brass bands in the world. It originated as multiple community bands founded by John Foster at his family's textile mill in Queensbury, West Yorkshire in the mid-19th century. The ensemble has become prominent in competitive band championships and through recordings for film and television.

The band is well-known for recording the soundtrack to the BBC gardening makeover series Ground Force in 1997, and appeared in the Christmas edition of Victoria Wood's sitcom Dinnerladies in 1999. In 1999 they played on the Academy Award-nominated song "That'll Do" from Babe: Pig in the City.  They have featured on recordings and live appearances by acts including The Beatles, Paul McCartney and Tori Amos. In 2014, the band won the National Brass Band Championships of Great Britain for a record 23rd time, and the British Open Championship for another record 30th time. They have also won the European Championships a record thirteen times, most recently in 2015.

History

The band was formerly the band of the Black Dyke Mills in Queensbury, West Yorkshire, England, a company owned by John Foster. Foster, a French horn player, joined with others in a small brass and reed band in Queensbury in 1816. This band faltered, and another band formed – called the Queenshead Band – which consisted of 18 musicians around 1843. This second band also faltered, but in 1855, Foster and other musicians established the new mill band, and outfitted it with uniforms made from the mill's own cloth. Most of the musicians in the band also worked at the mill, and a close bond was fostered with the local community. The band has remained active since that time, and still rehearses in its original rooms.

Black Dyke was the first band to achieve the "Grand Slam" in 1985 by winning the Yorkshire regional, European, British Open and National Championship contests. They were also voted BBC Band of the Year.

They appeared in an episode of Victoria Wood's dinnerladies sitcom in 1999.

European Championships

Recordings
Black Dyke Band has made over 350 recordings, including one of the first brass band recordings in 1904 and classical music. It has recorded with classical bass trombonist Douglas Yeo, and pop acts Tori Amos, Peter Gabriel and The Beautiful South. The band also worked with Gabriel on the highly acclaimed Millennium Show, featured in the Millennium Dome, as well as recording the music for the BBC programme Ground Force.

In September 1968, the band released a single on The Beatles’ Apple Records label. The A-side was an instrumental composed by Lennon–McCartney called "Thingumybob" (the theme to a London Weekend Television sitcom of the same name starring Stanley Holloway). The flipside was a brass band instrumental version of another Lennon–McCartney song, "Yellow Submarine". The single was released under the name John Foster & Son Ltd Black Dyke Mills Band, produced by McCartney, and was one of the first four singles issued on the Apple label. In 1979, the Black Dyke Mills Band worked again with McCartney on a track for the Wings album Back to the Egg. 

In August 2009, the band undertook a tour of Australia with multi-instrumentalist James Morrison which culminated in a concert at the Sydney Opera House.

Members 

The principals of the band's current line up include:
 Soprano cornet: Connor Lennon 
 Principal cornet: Richard Marshall
 Flugelhorn: Zoe Hancock
 Solo horn: Siobhan Bates
 Solo baritone: Katrina Marzella
 Solo trombone: Brett Baker
 Bass trombone: Adam Reed
 Solo euphonium: Daniel Thomas
 Solo E bass: Gavin Saynor 
 Solo B bass: Matthew Routley
 Drums: Logan Thompson
The band's current Principal Conductor and Director of Music is the Welsh euphonium virtuoso Prof. Nicholas Childs. His predecessor was trumpet player James Watson.

Paul Lovatt-Cooper was the band's Composer in Association and former principal percussionist. He retired from playing in early 2011 in order to concentrate on his teaching, conducting and composition.

Black Dyke Band is the brass band in residence at the Royal Northern College of Music in Manchester, and Childs also conducts the RNCM Brass Band.

Former members
 John Maines, principal trombone
 Maurice Murphy, principal cornet

References

External links 
 Black Dyke Band
 GNER train named after band in December 2005

British instrumental musical groups
Apple Records artists
Musical groups from West Yorkshire
Musical groups established in 1855
People from Queensbury, West Yorkshire
British brass bands